Tamara A. Townsend (born  August 17, 1970) is an American actress and singer. Townsend is best known for her roles as Wendy Reardon on the NBC daytime soap opera Days of Our Lives (1994–96), and Greta McClure, Eddie's girlfriend on the ABC/CBS sitcom Family Matters (1995–98).  From 2015 to early 2018, she starred as Kira Cooper, the mother of K.C. Cooper, on the Disney Channel series K.C. Undercover.

Early life
Townsend was born in Los Angeles, California, the daughter of Anorene, an African American interior designer, and Thomas Townsend, an American judge with English and Yugoslavian ancestry. Townsend is a 1988 graduate  of the Los Angeles County High School for the Arts.

Career
Townsend began her acting career in 1985, appearing in episodes of television sitcoms such as Diff'rent Strokes and Charles in Charge. From 1994 to 1996, she played Wendy Reardon on the NBC daytime soap opera Days of Our Lives. From 1995 to 1998, Townsend played the recurring role of Greta McClure in the ABC sitcom Family Matters. In 1997, she played the female leading role in the comedy film The Pest starring John Leguizamo. She has played guest-starring roles in Quantum Leap, Living Single, The Practice, Felicity, Walker, Texas Ranger, Friends, and CSI: Crime Scene Investigation. Townsend again appeared in a recurring role on the short-lived UPN sitcom Grown Ups with Family Matters star Jaleel White.

Townsend was a regular cast member on the short-lived sitcoms Rock Me, Baby (2003–04) and Sherri (2009). She also played recurring roles on Lincoln Heights, Switched at Birth, and The Client List. In 2015, Townsend began starring as Kira Cooper, the mother of Zendaya's lead character, on the Disney Channel sitcom K.C. Undercover.

Filmography

Film

Television

References

External links

1970 births
American people of English descent
American people of Yugoslav descent
American film actresses
American television actresses
Living people
African-American actresses
20th-century African-American women singers
Actresses from Los Angeles
Los Angeles County High School for the Arts alumni
20th-century American actresses
21st-century American actresses
21st-century American singers
21st-century American women singers
21st-century African-American women singers